Colletti is a surname of Italian origin. Notable people with the surname include:

 Lucio Colletti, Italian Western Marxist philosopher
 Ned Colletti , American sports executive
 Nicolao Colletti, also written Coletti (18th century), Italian mathematician and academic of the Republic of Venice
 Stephen Colletti, American actor and television personality
 Zoe Colletti, American actress

Italian-language surnames
Patronymic surnames
Surnames from given names